Boardwalk Empire is an American television series created by Terence Winter and based on the book Boardwalk Empire: The Birth, High Times and Corruption of Atlantic City by Nelson Johnson. The series debuted on September 19, 2010, and concluded on October 26, 2014 on HBO, consisting of 56 episodes over five seasons. Set in Atlantic City, New Jersey, during the Prohibition era, the series stars Steve Buscemi as Enoch "Nucky" Thompson (based on the historical Enoch L. Johnson), a political figure who rose to prominence and controlled Atlantic City, New Jersey, during the Prohibition period of the 1920s and 1930s. The series received widespread critical acclaim, winning various awards including Golden Globe Awards for Best Drama Series and Best Actor in a Television Drama Series for Buscemi for its first season.

Series overview

Episodes

Season 1 (2010)

Season 2 (2011)

Season 3 (2012)

Season 4 (2013)

Season 5 (2014)

Ratings

Home video releases

References

External links 
 
 

 
Lists of American crime drama television series episodes

fr:Boardwalk Empire#Épisodes
it:Episodi di Boardwalk Empire - L'impero del crimine (prima stagione)